Mucinous cystadenocarcinoma is a type of tumor in the cystadenocarcinoma grouping.

It can occur in the breast as well as in the ovary.  Tumors are normally multilocular with various smooth, thin walled cysts.  Within the cysts is found a haemorrhagic or cellular debris.

References

Gynaecological cancer